In the English language, collocation refers to a natural combination of words that are closely affiliated with each other. Some examples are "pay attention", "fast food", "make an effort", and "powerful engine". Collocations make it easier to avoid overused or ambiguous words like "very", "nice", or "beautiful", by using a pair of words that fit the context better and that have a more precise meaning.  Skilled users of the language can produce effects such as humor by varying the normal patterns of collocation. This approach is especially popular with poets, journalists and advertisers.

Collocations may seem natural to native writers and speakers, but are not obvious to non-native English speakers. For instance, the adjective "dark" collocates with "chocolate", but not with tea.

Compare:

Some collocations are fixed, or very strong. Many collocations are more open, where several different words might be used to give the same meaning, as an example keep to or stick to the rules.

Compounds and idioms 

Compounds are units of meaning formed with two or more words.  The words are usually written separately, but some may have a hyphen or be written as one word.

Often the meaning of the compound can be guessed by knowing the meaning of the individual words. It is not always simple to detach collocations and compounds.

car park
post office
narrow minded
shoelaces
teapot

Idioms are collection of words in a fixed order that have a sense that cannot be guessed by knowing the meaning of the individual vocabularies. For example: pass the buck is an idiom meaning "to pass responsibility for a problem to another person to avoid dealing with it oneself".

Types 
There are many different types of collocations.

Adjectives and nouns 
 Merry Christmas
Joe always wears blue or white or some other bright color.
We had a brief chat about Iraq but didn’t have time to discuss it properly.
Unemployment is a major problem for the government these days.
Improving the health service is another key issue for the UK.

Nouns and verbs 
The economy boomed in 2002.
The company has grown and now employs over 30 people.
The company has expanded and now has branches in most major countries.
The four companies merged in 2013.
They launched the product in 1998.
The price increase poses a problem for them.
The internet has created opportunities for his company.
There was heavy snowfall when our plane took off.

Noun + noun 
There are a lot of collocations with pattern a(n) ... of ...
a surge of anger
a sense of pride
a pang of nostalgia

Verbs and expression with prepositions 
As Bob went on stage to receive his medal you could see his sister swelling with pride.
I was filled with horror when I read the newspaper report of the war.
When she spilt apple-juice on her new blue skirt the little girl burst into tears.

Verbs and adverbs 
He pulled steadily on the rope and helped her to safety.
She placed the beautiful jar gently on the window ledge.
‘I love you and want to marry you,’ Michael whispered softly to Clare.
He smiled proudly as he looked at the photos of his new granddaughter.

Adverbs and adjectives 
Ben and Jane are happily married couple.
You are fully aware that there are serious problems.
George was blissfully unaware that he was in danger.

Adjective + Noun + Noun 
The collocation with pattern: a(n) (some adjective) state of repair, is one example.
The barn was in a poor state of repair.

See also 
SkELL – free online tool for finding collocations in common language

References

External links 
 Free Online Collocations Dictionary; 
 Linguatools Collocations Database; 
 Macmillan Collocations Dictionary 
 OXFORD Collocations Dictionary for students of English
 Longman Collocations Dictionary and Thesaurus

English grammar
Lists of English phrases